Expresso may refer to:

 Espresso, a coffee beverage
 eXpresso, a hosted workspace for Microsoft Office communities
 Expresso (Donkey Kong), a character in the Donkey Kong Country series
 Expresso (newspaper), based in Lisbon, Portugal
 Expresso (film), a 2007 English comedy short
 Plymouth Expresso, a 1994 compact concept car
 Sud Expresso, or Sud Express, an international train between Lisbon and the Spanish/French border at Hendaye
 Expresso Bongo, a 1958 West End musical
 Expresso Bongo (film), a 1959 film based on the stage musical

See also
 Expresso II, an album by Pierre Moerlen's Gong
 Espresso (disambiguation)
 Express (disambiguation)